Teeli (Teeli) is a rural locality (a selo) and the administrative center of Bay-Tayginsky District of Tuva, Russia. Population:

References

Notes

Sources

Rural localities in Tuva